The Sika Deer Ecological Park is a zoo housing sika deer in Green Island, Taitung County, Taiwan.

History
The growing of deer population in the island started in the 1970s. During its peak, the deer population outnumbered the population of the local people. After 1986, local residents started to release the deer into the wild. A zoo to be the captive place for those deer was established in 2007.

Architecture
The zoo features a captivity area, information center, paintball area, shops and viewing platform.

References

2007 establishments in Taiwan
Buildings and structures in Taitung County
Deer
Tourist attractions in Taitung County
Zoos established in 2007
Zoos in Taiwan